The Illinois Department of Financial and Professional Regulation (IDFPR) is the Illinois state government code department that through its operational components, the Division of Banking, Division of Financial Institutions, Division of Professional Regulation, and Division of Real Estate, oversees the regulation and licensure of banks and financial institutions, real estate businesses and professionals, and various licensed professions, and is charged with enforcing standards of professional practice and protecting the rights of Illinois residents in their transactions with regulated industries.

Description 
The Illinois Department of Financial and Professional Regulation was created on July 1, 2004. It is responsible for the regulation, oversight, and licensure of almost 300 different types of professional licenses and financial institutions. The current director ("Secretary") of this department is Mario Treto, Jr.
 
On April 1, 2014, Executive Order 3 (2014) was issued and created the Division of Real Estate.
 
In August 2013, Illinois became the 20th state to legalize medical cannabis when the Compassionate Use of Medical Cannabis Program Act was signed into law. IDFPR became responsible for licensing and regulating the dispensaries that sell medical cannabis to patients, along with each dispensaries’ Principal Officers, Agents-in-Charge, and Agents.
 
On June 25, 2019, Governor Pritzker signed the Cannabis Regulation and Tax Act, which made Illinois the 11th state to legalize adult use cannabis. IDFPR oversaw the successful rollout of the program, which allowed existing medical cannabis dispensaries to begin selling adult use cannabis on January 1, 2020. Similar to its medical cannabis licensing responsibilities, IDFPR licenses adult use cannabis dispensaries, along with the Principal Officers, Agents-in-Charge, and Agents at each dispensary. IDFPR is also responsible for tracking and reporting the sales made at adult use cannabis dispensaries.

Professions Regulated by IDFPR
Division of Banking
 State Chartered Banks, Trust Companies and Saving Institutions 
 Mortgage Loan Originators 
 Pawnbrokers 
 Residential Mortgage Companies State
 Student Loan Servicers

Division of Financial Institutions 
 Auto Title Lenders 
 Consumer Installment Lenders 
 Credit Unions 
 Currency Exchanges 
 Debt Management 
 Debt Settlement 
 Money Transmitters 
 Safety Deposit Boxes, Safes, & Vaults
 Payday Lenders 
 Sales Finance 
 Title Insurance

Division of Professional Regulation
 Acupuncture  
 Adult Use Cannabis 
 Architecture 
 Athletic Training 
 Audiology 
 Barber, Cosmetology, Esthetics, Hair Braiding, and Nail Technology Shops 
 Cemetery / Cemetery Managers 
 Collection Agency 
 Controlled Substance 
 Dentistry 
 Detection of Deception 
 Detective, Alarm, Security, and Locksmith 
 Dietitian Nutritionist 
 Electrologists 
 Environmental Health Practice 
 Funeral Directing and Embalming 
 Genetic Counselor 
 Geology 
 Home Medical Equipment and Service 
 Humane Euthanasia 
 Interior Design 
 Land Surveying 
 Limited Liability Company 
 Mail Order Ophthalmic Provider 
 Marriage and Family Therapy 
 Massage Therapy 
 Medical 
 Medical Cannabis 
 Medical Corporation 
 Naprapathy 
 Nursing 
 Nursing Home Administration 
 Occupational Therapy 
 Optometry 
 Orthotics, Prosthetics & Pedorthics 
 Perfusion 
 Pharmacy 
 Physical Therapy
 Physician Assistant 
 Podiatry 
 Professional Boxing and Mixed Martial Arts 
 Professional Counseling 
 Professional Engineering 
 Service Corporation 
 Psychology 
 Public Accounting 
 Respiratory Care 
 Roofing
 Sex Offender Evaluators
 Shorthand Reporting 
 Social Work 
 Speech-Language Pathology and Audiology 
 Structural Engineering 
 Surgical Assistant 
 Veterinary Medicine 
 Wholesale Drug Distributors

Division of Real Estate
 Auction 
 Community Association Management 
 Home Inspection 
 Real Estate Appraisal 
 Real Estate Brokerage

References

External links
 Department of Financial and Professional Regulation (official website)
 TITLE 38: FINANCIAL INSTITUTIONS of the Illinois Administrative Code
 TITLE 68: PROFESSIONS AND OCCUPATIONS of the Illinois Administrative Code

Financial And Professional Regulation
Bank regulation in the United States by state